The  is a large group of circular kofun burial mounds located in the town of Oirase,  in Kamikita District of Aomori Prefecture in the far northern Tōhoku region of Japan. It has protected by the central government as a National Historic Site since July 29, 2007 .

Overview
Located on a river terrace on the left bank of the Oirase River, approximately seven kilometers from the present-day Pacific coast at an altitude of 30 to 40 meters, this group of ancient tombs was variously known as the "Tenjinyama site" or the "Jusanmori site", and was believed by locals in pre-modern times to contain the graves of warriors, as evidenced by occasional fragments of swords and pottery which were uncovered by plowing nearby fields.

After the discovery of magatama beads in April 1986, the site was extensively excavated between 1989 and 1990 by the local Oirase Town Board of Education, and were discovered to consist of 108 domed kofun dating from the first half of the 7th century to the early 9th century AD. Many of the tombs had a shallow circumferential groove resembling a small moat. The tombs contained the remnants of swords, agricultural tools, beads and other jewelry articles, Haji pottery, and horse harnesses and the remains of wooden sarcophagus. Many of the items appear to have originated from the southern part of the Tohoku region, indicating frequent trade. The size of each tomb was approximately 10 meters in diameter, with a height of 1.1 meter. As the mounds are now flattened and do not appear above the present ground-level, a possibility exists that more undiscovered tombs exist in the area.

Approximately 3 kilometers east of this necropolis is the Nakanodaira archeological site, where more than 100 pit dwellings were discovered. The Negishi archeological site, which was the site of a large pit dwelling, was also nearby, suggesting that the people of lived in the locations had some relationship with the construction of the tombs. 

In 2016, the town of Oirase completed construction of a local museum at the site. It is located approximately 10 minutes by car from the Aoimori Railway Mukaiyama Station.

See also

List of Historic Sites of Japan (Aomori)

References

External links
Oirase town home page 
Aomori Prefecture home page 

Kofun
Oirase, Aomori
Historic Sites of Japan
Archaeological sites in Japan
Tourist attractions in Aomori Prefecture
History of Aomori Prefecture